CMD640, the California Micro Devices Technology Inc product 0640, is an IDE interface chip for the PCI and VLB buses. CMD640 had some sort of hardware acceleration: WDMA and Read-Ahead (prefetch) support.

CMD Technology Inc was acquired by Silicon Image Inc. in 2001.

Hardware bug 

The original CMD640 has data corruption bugs, some of which remained in CMD646. The data corruption bug is similar to the bug affecting the contemporaneous PC Tech (a subsidiary of Zeos) RZ1000 chipset. Both chipsets were used on a number of motherboards, including those from Intel.

Мodern operating systems have a workaround for this bug by prohibiting aggressive acceleration mode and losing about 10% of the performance.

References

External links 
 File containing technical information, FAQs, and tests regarding the corruption issues
 Linux's description of how it deals with the CMD640 corruption
 IBM: July 10, 1998 - Warp FixPak TIPS (includes section on how to detect and mitigate CMD640 concerns)
 
 EIDE flaw

AT Attachment
Hardware bugs
Integrated circuits